Unni Torkildsen  (14 August 1901 – 20 June 1968) was a Norwegian actress.

Biography
She was born in Kristiania (now Oslo), Norway. She was first married to actor Olafr Havrevold (1895–1972). Her second marriage was to the actor Oscar Egede-Nissen (1903–1976), the son of Adam Egede-Nissen and the brother of actresses  Aud Egede-Nissen (1893–1974), Gerd Grieg (1895–1988), Ada Kramm (1899–1981) and Gøril Havrevold (1914–1992), who was also the ex-wife of Torkildsen's first hushand, Havrevold.

Torkildsen spent her entire career at the Nationaltheatret, until retirement in 1964. She made her stage debut at Nationaltheatret in 1925, as "Ophelia". She was later appointed at Nationaltheatret, where she played many leading roles over the years, with a total of 161 assigned tasks at the theatre.

Filmography
 1925: Fager er lien
 1931: Den store barnedåpen as Georgine
 1932: Prinsessen som ingen kunne målbinde as the princess
 1937: To levende og en død as Helene Berger
 1946: Så møtes vi imorgen as Gerda Berg
 1954: Portrettet as Mrs. Hammer
 1958: Ut av mørket
 1959: Herren og hans tjenere

References

External links

1901 births
1968 deaths
Actresses from Oslo
Norwegian stage actresses